Temnora masungai is a moth of the  family Sphingidae. It is known to inhabit the country of Tanzania.

References

Endemic fauna of Tanzania
Temnora
Moths described in 2009
Insects of Tanzania
Moths of Africa

vi:Temnora mirabilis